Üllar is an Estonian masculine given name.

People named Üllar include:
Üllar Jörberg (born 1941), singer
Üllar Kerde (born 1954), basketball coach
Vahur-Üllar Kersna (born 1962), journalist
Üllar Peterson, historian
Üllar Põld (born 1962), actor and alpinist
Üllar Saaremäe (born 1969), actor and theatre director

See also
Ülar

Estonian masculine given names